The GasAndes Pipeline is a  long natural gas pipeline from La Mora, Mendoza in Argentina to San Bernardo on the outskirts of Santiago, Chile.

History
In 1991, Argentina and Chile concluded the Gas Interconnection Protocol. For the implementation of this protocol several pipeline projects were proposed. The GasAndes Pipeline project was proposed by the consortium of NOVA Corporation of Canada, Chilean companies Gasco and Gener, and Argentine companies Compañía General de Combustibles and Techint Compañía Ténica Internacional. The feasibility study of the pipeline was concluded in 1994. The pipeline was commissioned in 1997.

Technical features
It is supplied mainly from the Neuquén gas fields. Total investments of the project was US$1.46 billion.

See also

 Gasoducto del Noreste Argentino
 Cruz del Sur pipeline
 Yabog pipeline
 Paraná–Uruguaiana pipeline

References

Energy infrastructure completed in 1997
Natural gas pipelines in Argentina
Natural gas pipelines in Chile
Argentina–Chile relations